The ARCTIC refrigerator/freezer (ARCTIC) provided a thermally-controlled environment for storing biological samples prior to their return to Earth in the early stages of the International Space Station (ISS). The ARCTIC freezers supported several of these experiments on ISS during Expeditions 4 and 5.

References

International Space Station
International Space Station experiments